Gomillion v. Lightfoot, 364 U.S. 339 (1960), was a landmark decision of the Supreme Court of the United States that found an electoral district with boundaries created to disenfranchise African Americans violated the Fifteenth Amendment.

Background
After passage of the Civil Rights Act of 1957, activists in the city of Tuskegee, Alabama had been slowly making progress in registering African-American voters, whose numbers on the rolls began to approach those of registered white voters. The city was the location of the Tuskegee Institute, a historically black college, and a large Veterans Administration hospital, both staffed entirely by African Americans.

In terms of total population, African Americans outnumbered whites in the city by a four-to-one margin, and whites wanted to block the likelihood of being governed by the black majority. Local white residents lobbied the Alabama legislature to redefine the boundaries of the city. In 1957, without debate, and ignoring African-American protests, the legislature enacted Local Law 140, which created a 28-sided city boundary that excluded nearly all black voters from the redefined city, but no whites. The act was written by state senator Samuel Martin Engelhardt Jr., who was executive secretary of the White Citizens' Council of Alabama and an advocate of white supremacy. African Americans protested, led by Charles G. Gomillion, a professor at Tuskegee, and community activists mounted a boycott against white-owned businesses in the city. Gomillion and others filed suit against the city mayor and other officials, claiming that the act was discriminatory in purpose under the Fourteenth Amendment's due process and equal protection clause.

The U.S. District Court for the Middle District of Alabama, located in the capital of Montgomery and headed by Judge Frank M. Johnson, dismissed the case, ruling that the state had the right to draw boundaries of election districts and jurisdictions. That ruling was upheld by the Court of Appeals for the Fifth Circuit in New Orleans.

As head of Tuskegee, Booker T. Washington had promoted blacks advancing by education and self-improvement, with the expectation of being accepted by whites when they showed they were "deserving." At the time of the U.S. Supreme Court hearing of this case, journalist Bernard Taper wrote, 
Since the gerrymander was designed to defeat municipal suffrage rights of the highly "deserving" members of the Institute and the hospital staff, Session Law 140 has demonstrated, perhaps more than other symbols of Southern prejudice, the invalidity of Booker T. Washington's advice.

The redrawing of the city boundaries had the "unintended effect of uniting Tuskegee Institute's African-American intellectuals with the less educated blacks living outside the sphere of the school. Some members of the school's faculty realized that possessing advanced degrees ultimately provided them no different status among the city's white establishment".

Gomillion and his attorneys appealed the case to the US Supreme Court. The case was argued by Fred Gray, an experienced Alabama civil rights attorney, and Robert L. Carter, lead counsel for the National Association for the Advancement of Colored People (NAACP), with assistance from Arthur D. Shores, who provided additional legal counsel. The defendant team was led by James J. Carter (no relation).

Decision 
In this landmark voting rights case, the Supreme Court ruled on whether Act 140 of the Alabama legislature violated the Fifteenth Amendment.  Alabama passed Act 140 in 1957, which changed the boundaries of the city of Tuskegee, Alabama. It had previously been a square but the legislature redrew it as a 28-sided figure, excluding all but a handful of potential African-American voters and no white voters. Among those excluded were the entire educated, professional faculty of the Tuskegee University and doctors and staff of the Tuskegee Veterans Administration Hospital.

Justice Frankfurter issued the opinion of the Court, which held that the Act did violate the provision of the 15th Amendment prohibiting states from denying anyone their right to vote on account of race, color, or previous condition of servitude.

Justice Wittaker concurred but he said in his opinion that he believed the law should have been struck down under the Equal Protection Clause of the Fourteenth Amendment, not the 15th Amendment. According to Wittaker, just because someone has been redistricted to vote in another district does not automatically mean his rights have been denied; it is not a right to vote in a particular jurisdiction. But in this case, completely fencing African-American citizens out of a district is an unlawful segregation of black citizens and a clear violation of the Equal Protection Clause.

This case was cited in the Court's ruling in the Tennessee malapportionment case of Baker v. Carr (1962), which required state legislatures (including both houses of bicameral legislatures) to redistrict based on population, in order to reflect demographic changes and enable representation of urban populations. It established the principle of "one man, one vote" under the Equal Protection Clause.

Subsequent history
"The case showed that all state powers were subject to limitations imposed by the U.S. Constitution; therefore, states were not insulated from federal judicial review when they jeopardized federally protected rights." The case was returned to the lower court; in 1961, under the direction of Judge Johnson, the gerrymandering was reversed and the original map of the city was reinstituted.

In the 1980 case Mobile v. Bolden, the court limited its holding in Gomillion, ruling that racially discriminatory effect and intent would be necessary to prompt intervention by federal courts for violations of Section 2 of the Voting Rights Act.

Congress effectively negated Bolden in 1982 when it amended Section 2 of the Voting Rights Act, 42 U.S.C. § 1973. Congress' amendments returned the law to the pre-Bolden interpretation, under which violations of Section 2 did not require a showing of racially discriminatory intent, but it was sufficient to show discriminatory effect. This legislation was important for the many subsequent cases challenging political and electoral systems that resulted in dilution of voting or other effects that deprived citizens of their ability to elect a candidate of their choice.

See also
Gerrymandering
Hunt v. Cromartie 526 U.S. 541 (1999)
Baker v. Carr 369 U.S. 186 (1962)
List of United States Supreme Court cases, volume 364
Civil Rights Cases
Brown v. Board of Education of Topeka
 Timeline of the civil rights movement

References

Further reading
Elwood, William A. "An Interview with Charles G. Gomillion." Callaloo 40 (Summer 1989): 576-99.
Gomillion, C. G. "The Negro Voter in the South." Journal of Negro Education 26(3): 281-86.
Gomillion v. Lightfoot, 364 U.S. 339 (1960).
Norrell, Robert J. Reaping the Whirlwind: The Civil Rights Movement in Tuskegee, New York: Alfred A. Knopf, 1985.
Taper, Bernard.  'Gomillion versus Lightfoot:' The Tuskegee Gerrymander Case, New York: McGraw-Hill, 1962.

External links
 

United States Supreme Court cases
United States Fifteenth Amendment case law
United States electoral redistricting case law
1960 in United States case law
Civil rights movement case law
African-American history of Alabama
Legal history of Alabama
Macon County, Alabama
United States Supreme Court cases of the Warren Court
United States racial discrimination case law